Rachunia is a genus of flowering plants belonging to the family Gesneriaceae.

Its native range is Thailand.

Species:
 Rachunia cymbiformis D.J.Middleton

References

Didymocarpoideae
Gesneriaceae genera